John Starr  (died 8 December 2018) was a British geriatrician. He was Honorary Professor at University of Edinburgh and a Fellow of the Royal Institute of Public Health.

References

2018 deaths
Academics of the University of Edinburgh
20th-century British medical doctors
21st-century British medical doctors
Fellows of the Royal College of Physicians of Edinburgh
British geriatricians
1960 births